Kevin McMahon (born 1 March 1946) is an English former footballer who played as a forward in the Football League for York City, Bolton Wanderers, Barnsley and Hartlepool United.

References

External links
 League stats at Neil Brown's site

1946 births
Living people
People from Tantobie
Footballers from County Durham
English footballers
Association football forwards
Newcastle United F.C. players
York City F.C. players
Bolton Wanderers F.C. players
Barnsley F.C. players
Hartlepool United F.C. players
Gateshead F.C. players
English Football League players
Consett A.F.C. players